Mariveles, officially the Municipality of Mariveles, is a first class municipality in the province of Bataan, Philippines. According to the 2020 census, it has a population of 149,879 people.

History

Founded as a pueblo by a Franciscan Friar in 1578, Mariveles, the "Village of Camaya" was part of the Corregimiento of Mariveles, including Bagac and Morong, Corregidor and Maragondon, Cavite.  The name Mariveles comes from "Maria Velez", a mexican nun who eloped with a monk back in 1600's. With its natural cove, the port was used by ships from China and Spain to resupply.

The Superior Decree of July 1754 declared Mariveles' independence from Pampanga.

In the 19th century, the Americans established the first quarantine station in the old Spanish Leprosarium Hospital (now, the Mariveles Mental Ward).

Mariveles Bay was the site of Mariveles Naval Section Base, completed for the United States Asiatic Fleet on 22 July 1941, and was  surrendered to the Imperial Japanese Army on 9 April 1942. The Mariveles Airfield, a  dirt runway at the Section Base, was the starting point of the Bataan Death March.

Today the Bataan Economic Zone, has made the port of trading zone. Freeport Area of Bataan, and industry to the city. Agriculture is also a large part of the port export.

Geography
Mariveles is located around the Mariveles Bay, a large cove at the southern tip of the Bataan Peninsula. It adjacent to Manila Bay to the east, and the South China Sea to the west.

It borders Bagac to the west and northwest, Limay to the north and northeast, and Manila Bay to the east.

According to the Philippine Statistics Authority, the municipality has a land area of  constituting  of the  total area of Bataan. Of this, about 69% consist of the pastureland, 19% of forestland, 6% agricultural lands and the remaining 6% for residential and industrial use.

Climate

Barangays
Mariveles is politically subdivided into 18 barangays.

Demographics

In the 2020 census, Mariveles had a population of 149,879.

Mariveles is home to an Aeta community speaking a Sambalic language called Mariveleño.

Economy 

The Freeport Area of Bataan (formerly known as Bataan Export Processing Zone from November 20, 1972, to June 30, 2010) is a  industrial complex in Mariveles town that enjoys business advantages, including tax incentives, natural endowments, and leadership under Authority of the Freeport Area of Bataan (AFAB) Chairman Emmanuel Pineda. It is the only freeport in the country with a 10.9 million cubic meter-capacity dam that delivers 14 million gallons of water every day. It is complemented by water treatment and sewerage treatment plants which employ a sustainable waste water solution.

Government

Pursuant to the Local government in the Philippines", the political seat of the municipal government is located at the Municipal Hall. In the History of the Philippines (1521–1898), the Gobernadorcillo is the Chief Executive who held office in the Presidencia. During the American rule (1898–1946) (History of the Philippines (1898-1946)), the elected Mayor and local officials, including the appointed ones held office at the Municipal Hall. The legislative and executive departments perform their functions in the Sangguniang Bayan (Session Hall) and Municipal Trial Court, respectively, and are located in the second floor of the Town Hall and in the adjacent building.

The Municipal Mayor as of the 2016 national and provincial elections, serving his first term in office is Ace Jello "AJ" C. Concepcion.

The Sangguniang Bayan Members are:
+ Chairman and Vice Mayor: Angelito S. Rubia
 Councilors: Jaja P. Castañeda, Harry F. Golocan, Tito Pancho S. Catipon, Victoriano C. Isip, Angelito M. Sunga, Emerson Reyes, Joey Carandang, Susan Murillo, and Arvin V. Zurita (Municipal ABC President).

Tourism

Mariveles' attractions, events and historical landmarks include:
 Mariveles Five Fingers: A series of coves that looks like five human fingers when viewed from the air. 
 Mount Mariveles
 Km 0 marker of the Bataan Death March
 Lazareto de Mariveles: A Quarantine station established by the Spanish government in the 1850s to check and sanitize cargoes and passengers entering Manila. The Americans, upon their conquest of the Philippines, used the same system in their ports. The ruins of the old facility can be found inside the Mariveles Mental Hospital compound in downtown Mariveles. 
 Parish Church of Saint Nicholas Tolentine: The 1729 Parish Church of Saint Nicholas Tolentine (Cath.: 36,282 Titular: St. Nicholas Tolentine, Feast day, September 10, Vicariate of Saint Michael Archangel) belongs to the Roman Catholic Diocese of Balanga (Dioecesis Balangensis) Part of the Ecclesiastical Province of San Fernando, Pampanga. On September 9, 2005, Mariveles celebrated the 276th anniversary of Apo Kolas, the Patron Saint of Mariveles — San Nicolas de Tolentino, who arrived in this town through the Order of Augustinian Recoletos missionaries. Thus, the parish was founded in 1729 bearing the name of the saint. Bishop Ruperto Cruz Santos, bishop of the Diocese of Balanga, serves as parish priest of the parish church since June 5, 2020, with priests served under Santos' tenure as parish priest of the church are Rev. Fr. Robert Laracas, OSJ, Rev. Fr. Ponciano G. Balmes, OSJ, Rev. Fr. Marvin Gomez, OSJ, Rev. Fr. Gerald Cuenca, OSJ, and Rev. Fr. Christopher Alday, OSJ. Other priests can also celebrate in the parish church, such as Rev. Fr. Jay Quicho.

Infrastructure

Transportation
Mariveles can be reached through jet ferry plying the Mariveles to Manila route that has an approximate travel time of 40 minutes.

Expressway
The Bataan Provincial Expressway, also called Roman Super-Highway, is a limited-access toll expressway that connects Bataan to the provinces of the Central Luzon region in the Philippines. Mariveles is off Exit 55.

Energy sources

Utilities:
 Mariveles geothermal area in Bataan: a geothermal area situated along the West Luzon Volcanic Arc.
 GN Power Mariveles Coal Plant (GMCP), Alas-asin: 600-megawatt coal-fired power plant ($155 million was purchased by Conglomerate Ayala Corp. in December 2012).
 National Grid Corporation of the Philippines (NGCP) Mariveles Substation which hosts three 500 kV transmission lines which are Mariveles–Balsik, MPGC Mariveles–NGCP Mariveles, and GNPower Dinginin–NGCP Mariveles lines.

Education

Tertiary educational institutions include:

 Polytechnic University of the Philippines Bataan (PUP), a state university that offers baccalaureate (college) degrees where students are scholars of the government (after passing an entrance exam). Opened in 1976, the campus is located at Barangay Malaya, Freeport Area of Bataan (FAB).
 Maritime Academy of Asia and the Pacific (MAAP) located at Kamaya Point, Barangay Alas-asin, offering courses in the maritime industry. Students are accepted after passing stringent academic and physical examinations.
 TESDA Mariveles Bataan Branch, located at Barangay Camaya and near the Public Market, Mariveles Municipal Hall, and Freeport Area of Bataan, offering technical and vocational courses.
 Softnet Information Technology Center (SITC) located at second floor SFB #8, FAB, offering associate degrees in computer studies.
 Llamas Memorial Institute Inc.

Gallery

See also
 Roman Catholic Diocese of Balanga

References

External links

 Mariveles Official Website
 [ Philippine Standard Geographic Code]

Municipalities of Bataan
Populated places on Manila Bay